Trams in New Zealand were a major form of transport from the 19th century into the mid-20th century. New Zealand's first (horse) tramway was established in 1862 (Nelson), followed by a steam tramway in 1871 (Thames), and the first electric tramway in 1900 (Maori Hill, Dunedin). In New Zealand railway terminology a bush tramway is an industrial tramway, which usually did not carry passengers.

The tram systems in the main centres, and in some smaller towns, were soon electrified. By the 1950s, all systems were in the process of being replaced by trolley-buses or buses. The last tram service closed in 1964, in Wellington. A tram running parallel with a public road opened in Western Springs, Auckland, in 1980 and a central city loop line in Christchurch in 1995. Both are heritage lines.

In modern parlance, trams are known as "light rail vehicles", and modern tram proposals are referred to as light rail – such as proposed the light rail lines in Auckland.

History 

In 1862 the first horse tramway in New Zealand, between Nelson and the port, opened as part of the Dun Mountain Railway, built to export ore from the mine in the hills above Nelson. The legislation enabling the Dun Mountain Railways required a passenger service to be provided, which commenced from 7 May 1862 using a horse-drawn carriage, known as the "City Bus." The service closed in 1901 after a proposal to electrify it was defeated. Other horse-drawn tram systems were built on the West Coast of the South Island, where a gold rush started in 1864. Horse-drawn tramways could be found in Westport, Charleston, Brighton, Greymouth, Paroa, Marsden, Kumara, Arahura, Hokitika, Kaniere and Ross.

At Grahamstown (now Thames) in the North Island where gold had also been found, a steam tramway to Tararu was opened on 2 December 1871, but closed on 11 November 1874, due to there being "not sufficient traffic". A steam locomotive for the tramway was built at Mechanics Bay in 1872 by Fraser and Tinne. A steam-tram commenced service in Wellington in August 1878, claiming to be the first "steam-hauled street tramway in the Southern Hemisphere."

Horse-drawn lines also opened in the main centres; Auckland and Devonport in 1886, Dunedin 1879 and Christchurch 1880. The first electric tram ran to Maori Hill, Dunedin in 1900, and the tram systems in the main centres were all electrified in the 1900s. Dunedin also had several Cable Car lines to various suburbs and Wellington still has the Wellington Cable Car (actually a funicular) to Kelburn.

Most twentieth-century systems were electric with overhead wires, apart from the Takapuna (Auckland) steam tramway (1910–1927) and Gisborne, which had two battery-electric trams (1913–1929). The only system to be closed during this period was Napier, in 1931 after the Napier earthquake. Several long suburban lines were replaced by buses, e.g. Christchurch City to Richmond, Burwood and North Beach in 1934, and to Linwood in 1936.

During the 1950s and early 1960s all the tramway systems were replaced by buses or trolleybuses: Wanganui (1950), Invercargill (1952), Christchurch and New Plymouth (1954), Auckland and Dunedin (1956) and Wellington (1964). This followed a general international trend, especially in North American and British cities. The traditional tram systems of the period were perceived as a slow and outdated means of transport, characterized by inflexible routes and expensive infrastructure maintenance. In Wellington, there was significant opposition to the closure of the last tramway system in New Zealand, and the final decision to disestablish the remaining lines followed on a public referendum in 1959.

All trolleybus systems in New Zealand have now been closed: Christchurch (1956), New Plymouth (1967), Auckland (1980), Dunedin (1982) and Wellington (2017).

By city

Auckland

Auckland City 
Auckland City had a private company operating horse-drawn trams from 1884. The British Electric Traction Company purchased the Horse Tramway in the late 1890s. With the blessing of the various borough councils that presided over the Auckland isthmus, The Auckland Electric Tramway Co. Ltd built the initial tram systems in two years and the official opening was held 17 November 1902, but public service was delayed a week because three of the motormen, from Sydney, Australia, had been drowned in the SS Elingamite shipwreck near Three Kings Islands on 9 November 1902. Public service commenced on 23 November 1902 and was expanded until the mid 1930s and continued to 29 December 1956.

With services running from downtown at the Waitematā Harbour, across to Onehunga on the Manukau Harbour, Auckland had the world's only 'coast to coast' tramway system. The Electric Tram Company started as a private company before being acquired by Auckland City Council. The resulting council owned entity was required to run services outside the borders of Auckland City.

In 1938, a circular trolleybus route opened, operating from Queen Street – Wyndham Street – Hobson Street – Victoria Street and servicing the Farmers department store in Hobson Street. Trolleybuses may have been chosen for this service because the corner of Queen Street and Wyndham Street was too sharp and steep for trams. Electric trams operated a similar Farmers department store connection from a terminus stop in Beresford Street off Pitt Street along Hobson Street to a terminus stop in Wyndham Street.

From 1949 a modernization programme saw the electric tram routes being replaced by trolleybuses, commencing with the Herne Bay route and with trolleybuses eventually replicating the entire network by December 1956 when the last electric tram ran.

While the introduction of two light rail lines became a government commitment in 2018, as of   there are only two tram services in Auckland, the Western Springs Tramway and the Wynyard loop tram. Both are heritage systems. The Western Springs Tramway runs between two Museum of Transport and Technology (MOTAT) sites. The tracks run parallel to part of the original Point Chevalier tram route on Great North Road, but they were not part of the original system.

Wynyard loop tram 

Also known as the Wynyard Quarter tram and Dockline Tram, the service operates on a  circuit close to downtown Auckland. The route consists of the loop Halsey Street, Gaunt Street, Daldy Street and Jellicoe Street. There have been proposals to extend this in the future. The service was promoted and funded by the former Auckland Regional Council and now by Panuku Development Auckland. The tramway is operated by Auckland Tramways, administered by Panuku Development Auckland. Trams commenced testing and crew training on Friday 29 July 2011. The system was opened on 6 August 2011, prior to the 2011 Rugby World Cup.

Three former Melbourne trams have been used. X1 class 466, (was for a time 2011-2017 renumbered ATL 257), is being leased from the Newstead Trams based at Bendigo Tramways and arrived at the Ports of Auckland by ship 8 June 2011 and was delivered to the new tram shed 15 June 2011. From 2011 until 2015, Melbourne W2 class 421, then numbered ATL 258 was leased from Bendigo. In July 2015, SW6 model trams 852 and 881 arrived from Melbourne after becoming surplus to requirements. In September 2011, MOTAT's Western Springs Tramway loaned restored 1906 Auckland tram No.44 for the Auckland Heritage Festival and through summer 2011/12. No.44 was loaned again in September and early October 2012.

The MOTAT line was extended in 2006–07 to reach a second site of the museum, and the former Auckland Regional Council promoted the creation of an Auckland waterfront tram line, originally with MOTAT vehicles, but will initially operate former Melbourne trams leased from Bendigo Tramways Company Limited. The Auckland Tramway Limited opened 6 August 2011 with the support of Waterfront Auckland (later merged into Panuku Development Auckland) and the new Auckland Council. 

The Dockline Tramway has closed a number of times for the gentrification of streets around Wynyard Quarter which have involved re-levelling the roads. For instance in until October 2014, and again from mid 2015 until late 2016 while Gaunt Street and the southern end of Daldy Street were gentrified. In April 2017, trams ran on a short section of the line while roadworks and gentrification took place in Halsey Street and Daldy Street, including watergardens and realignment of the tramway along the reinstated Daldy Street. The Tramway was suspended indefinitely on 5 August 2018 due to Panuku selling an area that included part of its tracks to a developer, but was given a reprieve on 22 November 2018 with Auckland Councillors voting to reinstate the full original loop and have the tram running for the 2021 America's Cup, then review its future. The Dockline Tramway was reported to be re-opening summer 2020, Delayed due COVID-19 lockdowns, the Dockline Tramway was eventually reopened on Sunday 7 February 2021, after Panuku Development Auckland announced that MOTAT would be running the tramway on its behalf. The tramway operates Sundays 10am-4pm and during Public Holiday weekends. In November of 2021 the Auckland Council voted thirteen to six in favour of removing the tramway and the land the sheds now sit on have been sold. The tramway is expected to close sometime between April and July 2023.

Devonport 
The Devonport and Lake Takapuna Tramway Company operated a horse tramway on Auckland's North Shore from September 1886 to February 1888, running from Victoria Wharf to Cheltenham Beach. The tramway was taken over by Richard and Robert Duder (R. & R. Duder Company) in March 1888 and the tram continued to run until June, when all services ceased. The tracks remained in place until December 1894 when the Devonport Borough Council removed them and widened Beach Road (now King Edward Parade).

Milford to Bayswater 
In 1907 a group of local businessmen asked Auckland Electric Tramways Company to open an electric tramway on Auckland's North Shore, with a view to funding the scheme through land sales. Auckland Electric Tramways initially investigated the request, later declining it on the basis of a sparse population then on the North Shore. The same businessmen then formed the Takapuna Tramways and Ferry Company Limited to build and operate a ferry and tramway service. Their initial intention was for the tramway to be electrified, but insufficient capital and connections to Auckland's power grid prevented it. The company's ferry, Pupuke, was launched on 15 December 1909, with a new wharf built at Bayswater. The ferry was completed in time for the first service from Auckland City to Bayswater to meet the company's just completed steam tramway on 22 December 1910.

The company's tramway operated between Bayswater and Milford until 26 April 1927. It travelled along Lake Road, through Takapuna and circled Lake Pupuke. Built to standard gauge , the steam tram trailers had been built so that they could be converted to electric operation, built from the same plans and therefore to a similar design to Auckland City M and L type trams. The carriages were hauled by steam motors, built by Baldwin Locomotive Works of Philadelphia. Four were built for the tramway. A proposal to electrify the tramway in 1914 was put on hold and then cancelled due to the First World War. Instead, new steam motors arrived in 1919. The company then investigated electrification for a second time, eventually deciding to postpone any investment due to a lack of connection to Auckland's power grid or local power station. With competition from buses increasing, the tramway struggled financially and finally closed after 16 years, its ferries being sold to the Devonport Ferry Company.

The carriages were sold to Wanganui and Dunedin and converted to electric trams and the steam tram boilers were sold for other uses. A single trailer, which became a Dunedin electric tram "Takapuna" No.66, is the sole survivor, at the Otago Early Settlers Museum.

Christchurch 

Christchurch had steam and horse trams from 1880, then electric trams from 6 June 1905 to 11 September 1954. They were replaced by trolleybuses and motor buses. A Christchurch heritage tram line was established in the city centre on a loop track in 1995, and reopened on a limited circuit in November 2013 after being temporarily non-operational following the Christchurch earthquake of 2011, which interrupted tramway services while the CBD was cordoned off. The Tramway reopened 27 November 2013 on a combination of the original route and an extension that was in progress at the time of the earthquakes. There are plans to extend the route in 2014 to include the full pre-earthquake circuit and the extension through the Re:Start Mall and High Street which was nearly complete when the February 2011 earthquake struck.

The city loop is currently operating on a limited circuit after being reopened 27 November 2013 following the Christchurch earthquake of 2011 which halted services while the CBD was closed off. The tramway was being extended in several small stages starting late 2000s and was nearly complete when the 2011 earthquake struck. While these proposals are all officially heritage or tourist lines, there is some investigation into later extension or conversion for normal transport use. This line was extended in 2014 with the reopening of the full pre-earthquake circuit and the opening of the nearly complete extension through the Re:Start mall and High Street.

Dunedin 

In Dunedin electric trams operated on several routes from 23 October 1900 (Maori Hill) and 24 December 1903 (municipal service, to Normanby & Gardens) to 29 March 1956, and were replaced by trolleybuses and buses. The track gauge was

Gisborne 
Gisborne had Edison-Beach battery-electric trams from 13 April 1913 to 8 July 1929. There were two trams from the Federal Storage Battery Car Co, New Jersey and two from Boon & Co, Christchurch. AR Harris of Christchurch was the New Zealand agent for Edison Batteries. The trams were slow; their maximum speed was 32 km/hour, and initially they were restricted by the Public Works Department to 16 km/hour. There were two inland routes: Ormond Rd, and Gladstone Rd to Te Hapara (Lytton Rd). They were replaced by buses, following a close referendum in 1928.

Auckland Weekly News had photos of the interior and exterior of trams at the 1913 opening.

Invercargill 

Invercargill had the southernmost tram system in the world, horse trams 1881–1908, electric trams from 26 March 1912 to 10 September 1952. They were replaced by buses.

Construction began in January 1911 and lines to Waikiwi and Georgetown opened on 26 March 1912. Later that year two more lines opened, to North Invercargill and South Invercargill; the latter was the southernmost electrified street tram line in the world and ran to Tramway Road. The network operated as two routes: Route A between Georgetown and Waikiwi and Route B between North and South Invercargill. The Waikiwi line closed in 1947, though a section remained in operation until 1951. The Georgetown route closed on 2 July 1951, but the section to Rugby Park Stadium remained open until August 1951. The South Invercargill line closed on 31 May 1952. The last route, to North Invercargill, closed on 10 September 1952.

Napier 
Napier had electric trams to Port Ahuriri, from 8 September 1913 to 3 February 1931. The system was damaged by the Hawke's Bay earthquake on 3 February 1931 and was never restored, being replaced by buses. There was considerable debate about removing the trams, and their tracks and most of the overhead power lines remained in place for five years after the earthquake, a decision to remove them only came in March 1936.

New Plymouth 

New Plymouth had an electric tram service from 10 March 1916 to 23 July 1954, operated by the New Plymouth Corporation Tramways and reputedly the smallest municipality in the world to operate trams on the overhead electricity system. There were two main routes, through the town centre from the Port to Fitzroy, and from the town centre to David Street, Westown. In 1924 a short line was built to Pukekura Park (this closed in 1937) and proposals were also made for lines to Vogeltown and Frankleigh Park.

The Westown route was replaced with a fleet of 4 Crossley trolleybuses in 1950, in turn being replaced with diesel buses in October 1967. The Port-Fitzroy route was replaced directly by diesel buses in 1954.

There were 10 trams, 4 single-truck Boon cars (No.s 1–4), 3 Double-truck Boon cars (Nos 5–6 and 10) and 3 Birney Safety Cars introduced in 1921 (Nos. 7–9). These all lasted until closure of the system, at which time the bodies were auctioned off and sold. Only one tram body survives (Birney No 8) and is currently in Whanganui.

Whanganui 

Whanganui, then known as Wanganui, had electric trams from 11 December 1908 to 24 September 1950. The service went two ways from the city centre, inland to Aramoho and out to Castlecliff and the Port. The Castlecliff route competed with the Castlecliff railway and the success of the trams at winning patronage led to the cancellation of passenger trains in April 1932. The trams were replaced by buses.

Wanganui tram No.12 was restored in West Auckland by Dave Harre and his team and gifted to the people of Whanganui. The Tramways Whanganui Trust has united the body onto a former Brussels Brill 21e type four-wheel truck, and plans to renovate Wanganui tram No.8, New Plymouth Birney No.8 and Brisbane No.133. 120m of tramline has been laid alongside the Whanganui river between the new tram shed towards the berth of the PS Waimarie and runs regularly for the public. Further extensions have been mooted into the city streets.

Wellington 

Wellington had steam then horse trams from 1878, then electric trams from 30 June 1904 to 2 May 1964. They were replaced by trolleybuses and buses. Wellington now has the only funicular cable car line operating in New Zealand.

The Wellington Tramway Museum preserves and operates a collection of Wellington trams at the Kapiti Coast Electric Tramway, located in Queen Elizabeth Park near Mackays Crossing on the Kapiti Coast. Planning for a light rail system is underway.

West Coast 
Other horse-drawn tram systems were built on the West Coast of the South Island, where a gold rush started in 1864. The main towns, Greymouth, Westport, Hokitika and Ross, and smaller settlements like Brighton, Charleston, Kamiere and Kumara had wooden tramways. Publican John Behan of Charleston, now a ghost town, petitioned the Canterbury Provincial Council in 1870 for compensation after the rerouting of a wooden tramway along a branch road removed most of his stalwart drinkers. The 'bush tram' from Greymouth to Kumara took three hours, and during the trip passengers had to cross the Taramakau River in a cage or 'flying fox' riding on two wires. These tramways were for freight and passengers. There were few roads on the coast, and tramway owners were entitled to charge a toll to pedestrians walking along the tracks. Some of these were bush tramways, similar to other systems used to carry timber out of the bush.

Rolling stock 

The American firms of J G Brill, Philadelphia and John Stephenson Co, New Jersey supplied many trams, as well as other firms; English, Australian and local. Birney Safety cars were supplied by J.G. Brill Co. to Invercargill (6) and New Plymouth (3) in 1921, though they were too wide for Napier. Gordon Coates, then Minister of Transport was in New Plymouth for a test run on the new trams. When the driver showed how the 'dead man's control' worked by lifting his hand off the controller, the Minister and all were thrown to the floor when it nose dived on its front wheels then slumped back on the track with a shudder.

A distinctive feature of many Australasian trams was the drop-centre, a lowered central section between bogies (wheel-sets), to make passenger access easier by reducing the number of steps required to get inside of the vehicle.

Californian combination cars had an enclosed center section, with open-sided sections at each end. Hong Kong or toast rack (toastrack) cars were open, with the roof supported by a row of stanchions on each side. Most electric trams were single-deck, but Auckland, Wellington, Christchurch and initially Dunedin had some open-top double-deck trams. These were popular with courting couples! The Wellington Fiducia trams had access at each end only, with no separate middle section or center doors.

The Engineers of the Auckland Electric Tramway Company, BET Company designed their own tramcars, earlier models were built by Brush Engineering in Loughborough, construction post the Great War was exclusively by Auckland Coach Builders and increasingly the Tramway's own workshops at Royal Oak on Manukau Road. Rear entrance Dinghy "A type" four wheelers, and toast rack trams were trialed in the early years and a small number of C type double decker's used until the 1920s. The "Combo" or B type design pretty much laid the basic design of Auckland tram down from 1902. Entrances at either end, platform steps within the bodyline of the tramcar. The in-house design progression moved to the addition of windscreens, a separate Motorman's compartment from the M type in 1908 and a seat design and layout for 52 seated passengers that remained standard until closure in 1956. The design change of the bodies was cosmetically pleasing, but still seated only 52 passengers on wooden seats. Six of the streamliners used EMB L5 trucks imported from the UK, primarily where they were used under double deckers. The remainder used Brush Improved trucks, a design little changed for 30 years which were the mainstay of the Auckland fleet.

Track gauges 

Museums 

There are several tram/transport museums with operating vintage trams:
Museum tram operations commenced within MOTAT on 16 December 1967, to the Motions Road corner in 1980, to the Zoo in 1981 and to MOTAT's Aviation and Railway site in April 2007.
Tramways Wanganui Trust New Group formed to complete and look after Wanganui tram No.12 which was donated to the City of Wanganui after the body was privately restored in Auckland. Also plans to renovate Wanganui tram No.8 and New Plymouth Birney No.8 (yes duplicate fleet numbers) and Brisbane No.133 which were all donated to them un-restored by the Wellington Tramway Museum. They will run on a  heritage line built alongside the Whanganui River between the new tram shed and towards the berth of the P.S. Waimarie. The names of Wanganui and Whanganui and now both in use for the city.
Wellington Tramway Museum at Queen Elizabeth Park, Paekakariki (near Wellington); started 1965.
Tramway Historical Society operating the Ferrymead Tramway at Ferrymead Heritage Park, Christchurch, trams started 1968 (steam) and 1970 (electric).
Christchurch Tramway Ltd in central Christchurch since 1995
 Whangarei Steam and Model Railway Club has two  gauge former Lisbon trams 520 and 526 acquired by Dave Harre for a Heritage Trams for Henderson project in Auckland he was promoting, having previously been stored in Aspen, Colorado for another promoted tramway. One of the Lisbon tram bodies was restored by Harre's group prior to the Henderson project being abandoned and the trams being acquired by the Whangarei Group, which intended building an operating tramway attraction.
Bill Richardson Transport World museum in Invercargill has preserved Invercargill Birney Safety Car No.16. Recovered from Davaar sheep station near The Key. 
Toitū Otago Settlers Museum in Dunedin has a number of former Dunedin Cable Cars and Electric Tramcars in their static collection.

See also 
 List of town tramway systems in Oceania
 Public transport in New Zealand
 Trams in Australia
 Auckland Tram Number 304

References

Citations

Bibliography

 
 
 
 The West Coast Gold Rushes by Philip Ross May (1962, Pegasus Press, Christchurch) (Chapter 13, pages 371–376 re Tramways)

External links 
Tramways in 1966 Encyclopaedia of New Zealand
Stamp issue 1985; Vintage Trams
MOTAT Trams, Museum of Transport and Technology
Auckland Dockland Tram
Tramways Wanganui Trust
Wellington Tramway Museum
Christchurch Tramway Ltd, Heritage Tramway
Tramway Historical Society
Ferrymead Heritage Park
Bush tramways in Te Ara
Photo of wooden bush tram tracks near Greymouth c1890